Call Down the Moon was the eleventh studio album released by the Welsh rock band Man, and only the second since they had reformed in 1983. It was also their first American release in 20 years. It was recorded during November 1994 and released in 1995.

Track listing 
All tracks by Man

 "Call Down the Moon" – 9:25
 "If I Were You" – 7:33
 "Dream Away" – 6:04
 "Blackout" – 5:27
 "The Man with the X-Ray Eyes" – 7:06
 "Heaven and Hell" – 8:08
 "The Girl Is Trouble" – 4:03
 "Drivin' Around" – 12:20
 "Burn My Workin' Clothes" – 2:58

Personnel 
 Micky Jones – guitar and vocals
 Deke Leonard – keyboard, guitar and vocals
 Martin Ace – bass and vocals
 John Weathers – drums, guitar and vocals

References

External links 
 Man - Call Down the Moon (1995) album review by Dave Thompson, credits & releases at AllMusic.com
 
 Man - Call Down the Moon (1995) album credits & user reviews at ProgArchives.com
 Man - Call Down the Moon (1995) album to be listened as stream at Spotify.com
 

1995 albums
Man (band) albums